Starflam is the first album of the Belgium rap group Starflam. "Ce plat pays" is a remake of a song of Jacques Brel, about Belgium.

Track listing
"Intro" – 1:10
"J'étais là" – 3:53
"Monde confus" – 10:43
"Fusion organisée" – 2:46
"Ce plat pays" – 4:49
"Interlude" – 2:56
"La corde raide" – 5:29
"El Diablo" – 4:35
"Dépendant (part 2)" – 2:16
"Putain de songe" – 5:56
"Mic Smokin'" (featuring Ménage à 3, Assassin, Kabal, CNN199) – 6:01
"Onze bars" – 4:27

1998 albums
Starflam albums